Palmarin (also called Palmarin Fakao, Palmarin-facao, or Nguedj) is a coastal village in Senegal, located in Sine-Saloum near Sangomar Point between Joal-Fadiouth and Djifer.

History
Palmarin was formerly part of the Kingdom of Sine. Throughout the 19th century, the village participated in the trade of ivory and fur.
For more information visit www.palmarin.net

Administration
Palmarin is now part of Fatick Department in Fatick Region.

Geography
The nearest towns are Joal-Fadiouth, Ngalou Sessene, Mar Lodj, Mar Souloum, Diakhanor, and Guimsam.

Population
In 2003, there were 6698 people and 758 households in the rural community of Palmarin.

Economy
Palmarin's economy is dominated by fishing and agriculture, however tourism also make a contribution, thanks to the beaches, palm trees (which give the village its name), and palm wine.

Climate
Palmarin has a hot semi-arid climate (BSh) with no rainfall from November to May and moderate to heavy rainfall from June to October.

See also

Bibliography

References

External links

 The rural community of Palmarin on the PEPAM website

Populated places in Fatick Region
Petite Côte